Havdalah ("separation") is a Jewish religious ceremony that marks the symbolic end of Shabbat and ushers in the new week. The ritual involves lighting a special havdalah candle with several wicks, blessing a cup of wine (does not have to be wine) and smelling sweet spices. Shabbat ends on Saturday night after the appearance of three stars in the sky. Havdalah may be performed as late as sunset of the Tuesday following Shabbat.

Customs
Like kiddush, havdalah is recited over a cup of kosher wine or grape juice, although other beverages may be used if wine or grape juice are not available.

Spices, called besamim in Hebrew, often stored in an  artistically decorative spice container in order to beautify and honor the mitzvah, are handed around so that everyone can smell the fragrance. In many Sephardi and Mizrahi communities, branches of aromatic plants are used for this purpose, while Ashkenazim have traditionally used cloves. A special braided Havdalah candle with more than one wick is lit, and a blessing is recited. If a special havdalah candle is not available, two candles can be used, and the two flames joined when reciting the blessing.

Either right before or right after reciting the words "" it is customary for the participants to hold their hands up to the candle and gaze at the reflection of the light in their fingernails.

At the conclusion of Havdalah, some or all of the leftover wine is poured into a small dish and the candle is extinguished in it, as a sign that the candle was lit solely for the mitzvah of Havdalah; some pour directly onto the candle. Because it was used for a mitzvah, the wine is considered a "segulah," or good omen.

Havdalah is also recited at the conclusion of the following biblical holidays: Rosh Hashanah; Yom Kippur; the first days of Sukkot; Simchat Torah; Passover, both its first and last days; and Shavuot. The blessing over the wine is said, as well as the prayer separating the holy from the everyday, but not the prayers over the havdalah candle or the spices (except for the conclusion of Yom Kippur when the prayer over the havdalah candle is recited).

When a major holiday follows Shabbat, the Havdalah service is recited as part of the holiday kiddush and the blessing over spices is not said. The special braided Havdalah candle is not used since it may not be extinguished after the service, but rather the blessing is recited over the festival candles. The prayer "distinguishes holiness from the everyday" is changed to "distinguishes holiness from holiness" signifying that the holiness of the holiday is of a lesser degree than the holiness of the concluded Shabbat.

Significance
Havdalah is intended to require a person to use all five senses: feel the cup, smell the spices, see the flame of the candle, hear the blessings and taste the wine.

Following a normal Shabbat, the order of the prayers corresponds to the acrostic יבנ"ה Yavneh. This acrostic consists of the initials Yayin (wine), Besamim (spices), Ner (candle), and Havdalah (the Havdalah prayer).

The order of elements when Havdalah is combined with kiddush (e.g., on a Saturday night that is Yom Tov ("holiday", literally "Good Day") is known by the acrostic יקנה"ז Yaknhaz. This acrostic consists of the initials Yayin (wine), Kiddush HaYom (blessing the day), Ner (candle), Havdala (the Havdala blessing) and Zman (time, i.e. shehechiyanu).

Near the Qaddesh section in some Ashkenazic versions of the Haggadah (e.g. Mantoba 1560, Prague 1526, Venice 1609 and the Goldschmidt Edition),  there is a picture of a hunter chasing a hare. This picture is a useful mnemonic for the acrostic יקנה"ז Yaknhaz as it can be described by a Yiddish or German sentence that sounds like Yaknhaz. The Yiddish sentence יאָג 'ן האָז yog 'n hoz means "hunt a/the hare!" (cf. Yiddish יאָג דעם האָז yog dem hoz). The colloquial German sentence Jag 'en Has''' [jakenhaz] also means "hunt a/the hare!" (cf. German Jag einen/den Hasen!).

Blessings
 
The Ashkenazi liturgy for havdala after a festival or Shabbat is as follows:

The text of the Havdalah service exists in two main forms, Ashkenazic and Sephardic. The introductory verses in the Ashkenazic version (beginning הנה אל, Hinei El) are taken from the biblical books of Isaiah, Psalms and Esther. In the Sephardic liturgy, the introduction begins with the words ראשון לציון, Rishon L'tsion  and consists of biblical verses describing God giving light and success interspersed with later liturgical prose. The four blessings over the wine, spices, candle and praising God for separation between holy and profane are virtually identical between the traditions. In Reconstructionist Judaism, however, the phrase is omitted, as part of founder Mordechai Kaplan's rejection of the Biblical idea of chosenness.

Modern tunes for Havdalah are based on melodies by Shlomo Carlebach, Neshama Carlebach and Debbie Friedman.

See also
Shabbat
Special Shabbat

References

External links
Chabad.org: The Havdalah Ceremony 
Video of The Havdalah Ceremony

Shabbat
Jewish blessings
Hebrew words and phrases in Jewish prayers and blessings